Shedin Peak is the highest mountain in the Atna Range and in the Skeena Mountains of northern British Columbia, Canada, located  north of Hazelton at the head of Rosenthal Creek.

See also
 List of Ultras of North America
 List of the most prominent summits of North America

References

Sources
 
 Shedin Peak in the Canadian Mountain Encyclopedia
 "Shedin Peak, British Columbia" on Peakbagger

Two-thousanders of British Columbia
Skeena Mountains
Cassiar Land District